Aleksandr Antonovich Vasilyev (born 31 May 2000) is a Russian football player. He plays for FC Dynamo Vladivostok.

Club career
He made his debut in the Russian Football National League for FC Luch Vladivostok on 4 May 2019 in a game against FC Shinnik Yaroslavl.

References

External links
 Profile by Russian Football National League
 
 

2000 births
Sportspeople from Vladivostok
Living people
Russian footballers
Association football forwards
Association football midfielders
FC Luch Vladivostok players